Thirumangalam may refer to:
 Thirumangalam, Chennai
 Tirumangalam, Madurai
 Thirumangalam, Tiruchi
 Thirumangalam, Thrissur